Winwill is a rural locality in the Lockyer Valley Region, Queensland, Australia.

Geography
The eastern boundary of Winwill follows Tenthill Creek and Ma Ma Creek marks a small section of the western boundary. The Gatton–Clifton Road (State Route 80) passes through from north-east to south. The north and west of the locality is mostly rural residential while the eastern and southern parts of the locality are used for irrigated cropping.

History 

Education 
There are no schools in Winwill. There are primary schools in neighbouring Grantham, Lower Tenthill and Ma Ma Creek. The nearest secondary school is Lockyer District State High School in Gatton.

References

Lockyer Valley Region
Localities in Queensland